For ice hockey players in the National Hockey League (NHL), playing 500 consecutive regular season games is considered a highly significant achievement. This is often referred to as an "iron man streak".

As of the completion of the 2021–22 NHL season – the 104th regular season of play of the NHL – 26 players had played at least 500 consecutive regular season games in their NHL career, making it one of the most exclusive 500-clubs in the NHL.

The first player to play 500 consecutive games was Murray Murdoch, who played his 500th consecutive game during the 1936–37 season, the 20th season of the NHL. Phil Kessel is the current record holder, having played 1,000+ games consecutively; likewise, he is the only player to have recorded 1,000 consecutive games. Glenn Hall is the only goaltender to play 500 consecutive games (1955–1962), and Henrik Sedin is the only European player to do so (2004–2014).

Several streaks ended for reasons other than player injury. Both Steve Larmer's and Johnny Wilson's streaks ended due to contract disputes. Andrew Cogliano's run ended at 830 games because of a two-game suspension, while Patrick Marleau's streak ended at 910 games with his retirement. During his consecutive games streak, Marleau broke the NHL all-time record for games played, playing his 1,768th game on April 19, 2021. Other streaks ended because the player was a healthy scratch, or was sent down to the minors.

As of the beginning of the 2022–23 season, there are two players with active 500 consecutive game streaks: Phil Kessel and Brent Burns. Burns is the most recent member of the 500 consecutive game club, playing his 500th game on December 3, 2019. In addition to the formal record, Kessel has the unofficial all-time record for most consecutive games played including playoffs. Kessel has played 81 playoff games during his streak. 

Keith Yandle initially broke Doug Jarvis' consecutive games played record on January 25, 2022, when the Philadelphia Flyers took the ice against the New York Islanders. Kessel passed Jarvis on March 27, 2022, when the Coyotes played the Winnipeg Jets, and became the NHL's active iron man on April 2, 2022, when Yandle was scratched from the Flyers' starting lineup. Kessel then passed Yandle for the record on October 25, 2022, as his Vegas Golden Knights played the San Jose Sharks; he then became the first player to play 1,000 consecutive games on November 17, 2022.

Aside from Kessel and Burns, there are no other players that have started the 2022-23 NHL season with more than 300 consecutive games played. The next closest player to join the 500 consecutive games played is Columbus Blue Jackets forward Johnny Gaudreau, who has played 294 consecutive games prior to the start of 2022-23 NHL season.  Providing his streak remains active, he would be eligible to join the club midway through the 2024-25 NHL season.

500 consecutive games played
This is a list of the 26 NHL players who have played at least 500 consecutive regular season games in their NHL career, updated through games played on February 12, 2023.

Legend

( ) denotes games played in current season 

(C) streak is from the start of their career

References

National Hockey League statistical records
Lists of National Hockey League players